Cairo Steps is an ensemble was founded 2002 by the Egyptian German musician and producer Basem Darwisch. Cairo Steps has awarded the German golden jazz award in 2018.

About 

Cairo Steps was founded in 2002 by the Egyptian German musician and producer Basem Darwisch.

Cairo Steps merges and combines traditional Egyptian and oriental grooves with modern jazz improvisation, classical music and contemporary sounds. The ensemble has played numerous concerts in Egypt, Kuwait, Abu Dhabi, Italy, France and many stages worldwide with musicians and artists from around the world. The group includes members of different nationalities.

Awards 
On April 19, 2018, Cairo Steps collected The German Jazz Music award at Berlin ceremony with the ensemble members including Ines Abdul Dayem, Minister of Culture of Egypt, The ensemble received the award for their album Flying Carpet, which they created with German band Quadro Nuevo. The Egyptian minister of culture honored Cairo Steps in the Egyptian Academy in Rome after being awarded the German Jazz Music Award in April 2018.

The impact of The COVID-19 Pandemic 

On June 26, 2020, Cairo Steps with Quadro Nuevo, released a video of playing the soundtrack (Shams) produced in 2017 on the album (Flying Carpet). The video was released on Cairo Steps' YouTube channel To alert the community to domestic isolation and social distancing in anticipation of COVID-19. The track was played via video conference between the musicians.

On April 6, 2020, the Egyptian Ministry of Culture showed one of the previous Cairo Steps concerts that were at the Cairo Opera House and was among the videos that the Ministry of Culture published on its YouTube channel. The concert was released shortly after the launch of "Culture in Your Hands", an initiative to start performing theater performances, concerts and other cultural events over the Internet amid the closure of theaters, cinemas and concert halls due to the Coronavirus.

On November 2, 2020, Cairo Steps participated in the Arab Music Festival at the Cairo Opera House, the concert was held in the open air, taking into account the precautionary measures to prevent COVID-19.

Members 
Cairo Steps consists of many members from different countries:

 Basem Darwisch (Oud)
 Rami Attallah (Piano and Conductor)
 Jan Boshra (Cello) Strings Ensemble
 Max Klaas  (Percussions)
 Hani El Sawaf (Req)
 Azeema  (Tabla & Percussions)
 Ragy Kamal (Kanoun)
 Rageed William (Duduk and Nai)
 Stefan Hergenröder (E-Bass)
 Wolfgang Wittemann (Soprano Saxophone)
 Wael El-Sayed (Accordion)
 Emad Azmy (violin)
 Mahmoud Zakaria (Viola)
 Nehad Gamaleldin (Viola)
 Sherine Azmy (violin)

Cooperating artists and guests of honor 

 Mohamed Mounir
 Ali El Haggar
 Ali El Helbawi
 Ihab Youness
 Marwa Nagui
 Maher Fayez
 Monica George
 Ines Abdul Dayem

Discography 
Basem Darwisch led his team, Cairo Steps, to produce 5 albums and a large number of singles:

External links

Official Website of Cairo Steps

References 

Egyptian musical groups
German jazz ensembles
Jazz musicians
Musical groups established in 2002